Cheryl-Ann Sankar (born 26 February 1964) is a Trinidad and Tobago taekwondo practitioner, born in Port of Spain. She competed at the 2000 Summer Olympics in Sydney. She participated in the 1993, 1995, 1997 and 1999 World Taekwondo Championships. She won a bronze medal at the 1995 Pan American Games, and a silver medal at the 1996 Pan American Taekwondo Championships.

References

External links

1964 births
Living people
Sportspeople from Port of Spain
Trinidad and Tobago female taekwondo practitioners
Olympic taekwondo practitioners of Trinidad and Tobago
Taekwondo practitioners at the 2000 Summer Olympics
Pan American Games medalists in taekwondo
Pan American Games bronze medalists for Trinidad and Tobago
Taekwondo practitioners at the 1995 Pan American Games
Pan American Taekwondo Championships medalists
Medalists at the 1995 Pan American Games